Czesław, is an old given name derived from the Slavic elements ča (to await) and slava (glory). Feminine form: Czesława/Česlava. The name may refer to:

 Ceslaus, Christian Saint
 Czesław Białobrzeski, Polish physicist
 Czesław Bieżanko, Polish entomologist and recognized authority on South American butterflies
 Czesław Bobrowski, Polish economist in postwar Poland
 Czeslaw Brzozowicz, consulting engineer for the CN Tower, Toronto-Dominion Centre, first Toronto subway line
 Czesław Dźwigaj, Polish artist and sculptor
 Czesław Hoc, Polish politician
 Czeslaw Idzkiewicz, Polish painter and teacher
 Czeslaw Kozon, Roman Catholic bishop of the Diocese of Copenhagen
 Czesław Kiszczak, Polish general and politician
 Czesław Lang, Polish former road racing cyclist
 Czesław Łuczak, Polish historian, former rector of the Adam Mickiewicz University
 Czesław Marchaj, Polish yachtsman
 Czesław Marek, Polish composer, pianist
 Czesław Meyer, a fictional character who gained immortality in the Japanese light novel series Baccano!
 Czesław Michniewicz, Polish football manager and former player 
 Czesław Miłosz, Polish poet and Nobel Prize recipient
 Czesław Młot-Fijałkowski, a Polish military officer and a  brigadier general of the Polish Army
 Czesław Niemen, Polish singer-songwriter
 Czesław Okińczyc, Polish–Lithuanian politician
 Czesław Piątas, a Polish general, former Chief of General Staff of the Polish Army
 Czesław Słania, Polish-Swedish postage stamp and banknote engraver
 Czesław Sobieraj, Polish sprint canoer
 Czesław Warsewicz, former CEO and chairman of PKP Intercity S.A.
 Czesław Wycech, Polish activist, politician and historian
 Czesław Zbierański, Polish engineer, pioneer of Polish aviation, major of Polish Army

See also
 Časlav (name)

References

Slavic masculine given names
Polish masculine given names